This article lists the vice presidents of Republika Srpska.

Since the 2002 general election, in compliance with constitutional changes, the president of Republika Srpska has been a Serb and vice presidents have been a Croat and Bosniak.

Below is a list of office-holders:

See also 
President of Republika Srpska
List of presidents of Republika Srpska
List of prime ministers of Republika Srpska
List of speakers of the National Assembly of Republika Srpska

References 

Politics of Republika Srpska
Srpska
Srpska